The Ceremonials Tour was the second concert tour by the English indie rock band Florence and the Machine. The tour included performances at music festivals because it is lead singer Florence Welch's favourite way to perform live. Welch had originally planned to spend over a year touring for Ceremonials (their previous tour lasted almost three and a half years) before announcing that the December 2012 dates would be the final performances of the tour. On 25 February 2013, it was announced that Florence and the Machine would be playing at the Coke Live Music Festival in Poland on 10 August 2013, and, on 26 March 2013, it was announced that the band would be playing at Chime for Change's "The Sound of Change Live" concert at Twickenham Stadium in London alongside Beyoncé, Ellie Goulding and Haim, amongst others.

The Ceremonials Tour was a critical and commercial success. Pollstar announced that it was the 40th best-selling tour in the world in 2012 having earned $31.8 million worldwide and having sold 618,436 tickets. Paste magazine ranked the tour the seventh best tour of 2012.

Opening acts
 Laura Marling – (Chicago Theatre)
 Two Door Cinema Club – (Midland Theatre)
 Cowboy Indian Bear – (Midland Theatre)
 The Head and the Heart – (WaMu Theater)
 Mat Kearney – (WaMu Theater)
 The Horrors – (UK & Ireland March 2012)
 Spector – (UK & Ireland March 2012, excluding 9, 10 March, and mainland Europe)
 Theme Park – (9 March)
 Alpines –  10 March (Alexandra Palace)
 Blood Orange –  (Spring North American dates, Australia dates and New Zealand)
 The Walkmen –  (Summer North American dates) 
 The Maccabees –  (Fall North American dates) 
 The Weeknd –  (Fall North American dates) 
 Snow Patrol – (Phoenix Park, co-headlining)
 The Temper Trap – (Phoenix Park)
 Haim – (UK & Ireland December 2012)
 Yna – (Gaston Park)

Setlist

Tour dates

Festivals and other miscellaneous performances

Background and reception
Florence and the Machine played their first performance in support of Ceremonials at New York City's The Boom Boom Room. The performance was sponsored by Interview Magazine, which Florence Welch appeared on the October 2011 cover of.

The band played at the Seymour Centre in Sydney, Australia in November where Florence performed in a Jason Wu Fall 2011 dress. The Daily Telegraph reported that the Seymour Centre show was sold-out and called the performance "wonderful" and "another awesome music memory".

Selected box office score data

External links
Florence and the Machine's Official Website

References

2011 concert tours
2012 concert tours
Florence and the Machine concert tours